Alstom DDF, formerly De Dietrich Ferroviaire (DDF) is a French manufacturer of railway rolling stock and a subsidiary of Alstom, based in Reichshoffen, France.  It was formed as a division of the De Dietrich group, which has a history going back to 1684.

History

Origins 
DDF constructed the carriages for the Enterprise train service jointly operated by Iarnród Éireann and Northern Ireland Railways between Dublin in the Republic of Ireland and Belfast in Northern Ireland.  

DDF were part of the consortium which constructed the rolling stock for the Eurostar service from London in the United Kingdom through the Channel Tunnel to Paris, France and Brussels, Belgium.

In the 1990s, a majority stake in DDF was acquired by Alstom and the company is now known as Alstom DDF.

Acquisition by Alstom 
In particular, Alstom DDF produces the Régiolis regional trains in the Alstom Coradia range. The Reichshoffen plant is also to produce hydrogen trains for the French Grand Est region.

In July 2020, the French manufacturer Alstom announces that it is ready to sell the Alstom DDF plant in Reichshoffen, Alsace in order to finalise the takeover of Bombardier's railway activities.

References

External links

 De Dietrich dynasty's own website

 
Alstom